Leland Tyler Wayne (born September 16, 1993), known professionally as Metro Boomin, is an American record producer, record executive, and DJ. He is known for his dark production style and its influence on modern hip hop and trap. He has become famous in the music industry for his producer tag "If Young Metro don't trust you, I'm going to shoot you." He has worked with artists such as 21 Savage and Travis Scott

Raised in St. Louis, Wayne began his music career as a producer in 2009, at age 16; he relocated to Atlanta to attend Morehouse College in 2011 and continued to work extensively with Atlanta-based artists Young Thug, Future, 21 Savage, Gucci Mane, and Migos. Wayne gained mainstream success after producing the song "Tuesday" by iLoveMakonnen and Drake, which reached number 12 on the U.S. Billboard Hot 100. Wayne subsequently produced the U.S. top-20 singles "Jumpman" by Drake and Future and "Low Life" by Future featuring the Weeknd before attaining his first number one with "Bad and Boujee" by Migos. He followed this with "Congratulations" by Post Malone, "Tunnel Vision" by Kodak Black, "Mask Off" by Future, "Bank Account" by 21 Savage and his second U.S. number one "Heartless" by the Weeknd. 

Wayne released the collaborations Savage Mode (2016) and Savage Mode II (2020) with 21 Savage, DropTopWop (2017) with Gucci Mane, Perfect Timing (2017) with Nav, Double or Nothing (2017) with Big Sean. Wayne's debut studio album Not All Heroes Wear Capes (2018), and its follow-up, Heroes & Villains (2022), both debuted at number one on the U.S. Billboard 200. The latter of which spawned the single "Creepin" alongside The Weeknd and 21 Savage , which reached the top ten in several countries, including the U.S. and the United Kingdom.

Early life 
Leland Tyler Wayne was born on September 16, 1993, in St. Louis, Missouri, where he attended Parkway North High School. He has four siblings. After a brief stint playing bass guitar in his middle school band, he turned to making beats in the seventh grade at age 13. This happened when his mother bought him a laptop and he got a copy of the music production software FruityLoops. In high school, he produced five beats a day. Initially, Wayne wanted to rap, and started making beats so that he could have music to rap over. However, he eventually turned his full attention toward hip hop production. As he continued to hone his production skills, while still in high school, he began to utilize online social media platforms, such as Twitter, to network with more established rap artists as well as beat submissions for potential music placements.

Career

2009–2012: Career beginnings 
During high school, Metro's mother would often drive him for over eight hours from St. Louis to Atlanta to collaborate with artists he met online. One of the first artists with whom he worked was Bricksquad Monopoly rapper Tay Don which led him to collaborate with Bricksquad label artists such as OJ da Juiceman, Gucci Mane, and eventually his frequent collaborator Future, an artist that he continues to collaborate with to this day. Upon graduating high school, Metro Boomin moved to Atlanta to attend Morehouse College, studying Business Management. He chose to take a hiatus from school after a semester, because the schedule demands of a full-time music career became too much to balance. Metro has collaborated with artists including Nicki Minaj, Ludacris, Juicy J, Yo Gotti, 21 Savage, Wiz Khalifa, Chief Keef, The Weeknd, YG, Young Jeezy, Meek Mill, Travis Scott, Ace Hood, Young Scooter, Young Thug, Lil Durk,  Rich Homie Quan, Trinidad James, Drake, Lana Del Rey, Lil Uzi Vert, Migos, DJ Khaled, Schoolboy Q, Post Malone, Nav, Swae Lee, Gunna, Lil Wayne, Waka Flocka Flame,  Thundercat, and Kanye West. Metro also regularly collaborates with other modern hip hop producers, including Sonny Digital, 808 Mafia, Southside, Zaytoven, Young Chop, DJ Spinz and Tay Keith on Not All Heroes Wear Capes.

Metro Boomin has worked extensively with rapper Future. The two first worked together on a song called "Hard", included on DJ Esco's Welcome 2 Mollyworld mixtape, and have collaborated on numerous songs since, including two singles from Future's second album, Honest, the album's lead single, "Karate Chop", and title track, "Honest", co-produced by DJ Spinz.

2013–2016: Rise to fame 
In May 2013, Metro announced his debut mixtape, 19 & Boomin. Following warm-up singles, featuring artists like Trinidad James, Gucci Mane, and others, Metro released the mixtape, hosted by mixtape website LiveMixtapes, on October 7, 2013. The mixtape, all original songs, included "Maison Margiela", featuring Future, and "Some More", featuring Young Thug, both of which were subsequently released as music videos.

In March 2014, Metro and Young Thug announced that they would release a collaborative album, performed and released under the moniker "Metro Thuggin". The album was to be self-titled and was planned to be released sometime in 2015. Along with the announcement, Metro Thuggin released the collaborative track, "The Blanguage". The 'Metro Thuggin' project was ultimately scrapped. Photographer Cam Kirk claims to have a copy of the complete, finished album. A few leaked tracks from the project were found circulating the internet in late 2015, yet an official mixtape has never surfaced.

In 2014, Metro made an appearance on Nicki Minaj's third studio album, The Pinkprint, producing the track "Want Some More".

In October 2014, Metro executive produced Future's Monster mixtape. This spawned the first appearance of the single "Fuck Up Some Commas". Metro produced the sixth single from Future's Honest, "I Won", which features Kanye West. The song became a single a month after the album was released.

Metro served as executive producer for Drake and Future's collaborative mixtape What a Time to Be Alive, released on September 20, 2015. In addition, he produced or co-produced seven of the 11 tracks on the mixtape.

Metro served alongside DJ Esco as executive producer for Future's 2016 mixtape, Purple Reign. In 2016, he won Producer of the Year at the BET Hip Hop Awards.

In 2016, Metro Boomin was credited with produced charting hits such as "Jumpman" by Future and Drake, "Bad and Boujee" by Migos, "Low Life" by Future and The Weeknd, and the 21 Savage collaboration "X". That year, he contributed to Kanye West's The Life of Pablo, and he and 21 Savage released the EP Savage Mode. In 2017, he produced charting singles such as "Tunnel Vision" by Kodak Black, "Bounce Back" by Big Sean, "Mask Off" by Future, and "Bank Account" by 21 Savage.

2017: Perfect Timing, Without Warning, Double or Nothing 
On July 14, 2017, Metro and rapper and fellow record producer Nav released two singles, "Perfect Timing (Intro)" and "Call Me", the dual lead singles from their collaborative mixtape, Perfect Timing. The mixtape was released by Boominati Worldwide, XO, and Republic Records, one week later, on July 21. It features guest appearances from Lil Uzi Vert, Playboi Carti, Offset, 21 Savage, Belly, and Gucci Mane.

On October 31, 2017, Metro and rappers 21 Savage and Offset released their collaborative studio album, Without Warning, as a surprise release. On the same day, "Ric Flair Drip", performed by Metro and Offset was released as the lead single. The album features guest appearances from Travis Scott and Quavo.

On November 3, 2017, Metro and rapper Big Sean released a single titled "Pull Up n Wreck", featuring rapper 21 Savage, the lead single from their collaborative studio album, Double or Nothing. The mixtape was released on December 8, 2017. It features guest appearances from Travis Scott, 2 Chainz, 21 Savage, Kash Doll, Young Thug, and Swae Lee. On February 13, 2018, "So Good", featuring Kash Doll became the lead single.

2018–2021: Not All Heroes Wear Capes and Savage Mode II 
In January 2018, Metro Boomin was featured in a Gap campaign with singer SZA, alongside a self-produced remix of "Hold Me Now". The remix was released to digital platforms on the same day as the campaign. In an interview with XXL, explaining the campaign with Gap and the remix, he stated;

In April 2018, Metro Boomin announced his "retirement" from rap on his Instagram page, changing his bio to "Retired record producer/DJ". However, he since garnered production credits on Nicki Minaj's fourth studio album Queen, as well as Minaj's labelmate Lil Wayne, on his twelfth studio album, Tha Carter V, which both debuted in the top 5 of the Billboard 200.

On October 26, 2018, multiple billboards appeared in Atlanta and New York depicting Metro Boomin as a "missing person". It was later revealed to be a teaser for his debut studio album, Not All Heroes Wear Capes, for his comeback, which he had been working on since 2015. The album was released on November 2, 2018, and features guest appearances from Gucci Mane, Travis Scott, 21 Savage, Swae Lee, Gunna, Young Thug, Wizkid, J. Balvin, Offset, Kodak Black, and Drake. Not All Heroes Wear Capes debuted at number one on the Billboard 200 and number 16 on the UK Top 40 Albums.

On November 27, 2019, he co-produced The Weeknd's fourth Billboard Hot 100 number-one single "Heartless", with Illangelo and Dre Moon. The song was released as the lead single from the singer's fourth studio album, After Hours (2020). Metro also helped produce three other tracks on the album, "Escape from LA", "Faith" and "Until I Bleed Out".

On September 29, 2020, Metro and 21 Savage announced their fourth collaborative project, Savage Mode II, a sequel to their EP, Savage Mode (2016). It features guest appearances from Drake, Young Thug, and Young Nudy. On October 13, 2020, the dual lead singles became "Runnin" and "Mr. Right Now", the latter of which features Drake. The album was released on October 2, 2020, and debuted atop on the Billboard 200 chart, earning both artists their second number-one albums, which were also back-to-back for both artists.

2022–present: Heroes & Villains 

On November 22, 2022, Metro announced the title of his upcoming second studio album: Heroes & Villains, which released on December 2. On November 30, he released an accompanying short film preview for the album. The film was directed by Gibson Hazard and featured appearances by Metro, Gunna, LaKeith Stanfield, Morgan Freeman, and Young Thug.

The album was released on December 2, 2022 with guest appearances from John Legend, Future, Chris Brown, Don Toliver, Travis Scott, Young Nudy, The Weeknd, 21 Savage, Young Thug, Mustafa, A$AP Rocky, Takeoff, and Gunna. The album was received well by audiences, with many considering it Metro's best work to date and complimenting the production and featured artists' performances.

On December 13, 2022, Metro was confirmed to be working on the soundtrack for the upcoming Spider-Man: Across the Spider-Verse film by screenwriters Phil Lord and Christopher Miller.

Musical style 
Specializing in the trap sub-genre of hip hop, Metro Boomin utilizes a distinctive mix of heavy bass, rattling synthetic percussion and dark, gothic melodies. Metro Boomin hardly strays from hip hop, although he has produced 4 tracks from The Weeknd's R&B album After Hours; in addition, he has also remixed pop songs such as "Hold Me Now" (produced as a Gap marketing collaboration).

Producer tags 
In hip hop music, producers may choose to mark their work with a producer tag, a catchy shout-out usually placed at the beginning of a song which allows listeners to recognize and appreciate certain producers.

One of Boomin's tags, "Metro Boomin want some more, nigga", originates from vocals of the Boomin-produced song "Some More" by Young Thug, and received widespread attention in early 2016.

Metro's most prominent and iconic tag "If Young Metro don't trust you I'm gon' shoot you" is performed by Future. The origin of the tag comes from the song "Right Now" by Uncle Murda, also produced by Boomin. The tag appeared first in Drake and Future's 2015 song, "Jumpman" from the collaborative mixtape What a Time to Be Alive, and gained widespread attention after its use in the Kanye West song "Father Stretch My Hands, Pt. 1".

Metro is known for his tag "Young Metro, young Metro, young Metro" spoken by his longtime collaborator Future. Boomin' often references "3x" or "Young Metro 3x" as a nod to this signature tag.

Another one of Boomin's tags is just "Metro!", originally spoken by Young Thug on his song "Hercules". The tag can be most prominently heard at the beginning of the Metro produced song "Mr. Right Now" by 21 Savage and Drake, off the 2020 cut Savage Mode II, as well as appearing various times in Heroes & Villains.

Boomin's latest tag "Metro in this bitch goin' brazy" can be heard in the track 'More M's' from 21 Savage's and Drake's album Her Loss. The tag originated from the track "No Opp Left Behind" from 21 Savage's album Savage Mode II.

Personal life
Wayne's mother, Leslie Joanne Wayne, was killed in a murder-suicide by his stepfather on June 5, 2022.

Boominati Worldwide 
Boominati Worldwide is a label owned by Metro Boomin. It was launched in June 2017 in partnership with Republic Records and Universal Music Group. Metro stated: "Launching Boominati Worldwide is the next step in my career as a producer, an artist and a businessman. I created the label to represent a collective of highly gifted individuals who have the shared gift of being able to influence the world through culture and art".

Discography 

Studio albums
 Not All Heroes Wear Capes (2018)
 Heroes & Villains (2022)

Collaborative albums
 Without Warning  (2017)
 Double or Nothing  (2017)
 Savage Mode II  (2020)

Awards and nominations

Notes

References

External links 

1993 births
Living people
African-American businesspeople
African-American record producers
American hip hop DJs
American hip hop record producers
Businesspeople from Atlanta
Businesspeople from Missouri
Epic Records artists
Morehouse College alumni
Musicians from Atlanta
Musicians from St. Louis
Republic Records artists
Southern hip hop musicians
Trap musicians